The Troumassée River is a river in Saint Lucia. It rises in the centre of the island, flowing southeast to its mouth close to the town of Micoud on the southeast coast.

See also
List of rivers of Saint Lucia

References

Rivers of Saint Lucia